Georges Darboy (16 January 181324 May 1871) was a French Catholic priest, later bishop of Nancy then archbishop of Paris. He was among a group of prominent hostages executed as the Paris Commune of 1871 was about to be overthrown.

Biography
Darboy was born in Fayl-Billot, Haute-Marne in north-east France. He studied with distinction at the seminary at Langres, and was ordained priest in 1836. Transferred to Paris as almoner of the college of Henry IV, and honorary canon of Notre Dame, he became the close friend of Archbishop Affre and of his successor Archbishop Sibour. He was appointed bishop of Nancy in 1859, and in January 1863 was raised to the archbishopric of Paris.

Darboy was a strenuous upholder of episcopal independence in the Gallican sense, and involved himself in a controversy with Rome by his endeavours to suppress the jurisdiction of the Jesuits and other religious orders within his diocese. Pope Pius IX refused him the cardinal's hat, and rebuked him for his liberalism in a letter which was probably not intended for publication. He is also known for his opposition in 1868 to Jacques-Paul Migne, forbidding him to continue his low-cost books business after the burning of his printing establishment, and suspending him from his priestly functions. At the First Vatican Council he vigorously maintained the rights of the bishops, and strongly opposed the dogma of papal infallibility, against which he voted as inopportune. When the dogma had been finally adopted, however, he was one of the first to set the example of submission.

Immediately after his return to Paris the war with Prussia broke out, and his conduct during the disastrous year that followed was marked by a devoted heroism which has secured for him an enduring fame. He was active in organizing relief for the wounded at the commencement of the war, remained at his post during the siege, and refused to seek safety by flight during the brief triumph of the Paris Commune. On 4 April 1871, he was arrested by the Communards as a hostage and confined in Mazas Prison. The Communards offered to exchange him and several priests for Louis Auguste Blanqui, who was being held by the Versailles government. He was transferred to La Roquette Prisons on the advance of the Versailles army, and on 24 May he was shot within the prison along with several other prominent hostages. The execution was ordered by Théophile Ferré, who later was executed by firing squad by the French government after the fall of the Commune.

Darboy died in the attitude of blessing and uttering words of forgiveness. His body was recovered with difficulty, and, having been embalmed, was buried with imposing ceremony at public expense on 7 June. He was the third archbishop of Paris to die violently between 1848 and 1871 after Denis Auguste Affre (killed 1848) and Marie-Dominique-Auguste Sibour (assassinated in 1857).

Works
 Œuvres de Saint Denys l'Aréopagite (1845).
 Les Femmes de la Bible (1846–1849).
 Les Saintes Femmes (1850).
 Lettres à Combalot (1851).
 Jérusalem et la Terre Sainte (1852).
 L'Imitation de Jésus-Christ (1852).
 Statistique Religieuse du Diocèse de Paris (1856).
 Saint Thomas Becket (1858).
 Du Gouvernement de Soi-même (1867).

See also
 List of works by Eugène Guillaume
 Raoul Rigault

References

Further reading
 Horvath-Peterson, Sandra (1982). "Abbé Georges Darboy's 'Statistique Religieuse du Diocèse de Paris' (1856)," The Catholic Historical Review, Vol. 68, No. 3, pp. 401–450.
 Katz, Philip M. (1994). "'Lessons from Paris': The American Clergy Responds to the Paris Commune," Church History, Vol. 63, No. 3, pp. 393–406.
 Parsons, Reuben (1901). "The Clerical Victims of the Commune of 1871." In: Studies in Church History, Vol. VI. New York: Fr. Pustet & Co., pp. 85–110.
  Price, Lewis C. (1915). Archbishop Darboy and Some French Tragedies, 1813-1871. London: George Allen & Unwin.
 Vizetelly, Ernest Alfred (1914). My Adventures in the Commune, Paris, 1871. London: Chatto & Windus.

External links

 
 Works by Georges Darboy, at Hathi Trust

1813 births
1871 deaths
People from Langres
Bishops of Nancy
Archbishops of Paris
People of the Paris Commune
19th-century Roman Catholic archbishops in France
Grand Officiers of the Légion d'honneur
Executed French people
French anti-communists
Executed people from Champagne-Ardenne